Galatasaray Rowing Team is the men's and women's rowing section of Galatasaray S.K., a major sports club in Istanbul, Turkey. The club is based at Lake Küçükçekmece, in Kanarya neighborhood west of İstanbul.

İhsan Emre Vural and his teammate Ahmet Yumrukaya became the first world-champions in the history of Turkey when they got first place in the 2004 World Rowing Under 23 Championships held in Poznań, Poland.

In 2013, Galatasaray Rowing Team won Turkish Rowing Championship Cup.

Technical staff

Current squad

Domestic Success

Turkish Rowing Championship:
Winners (27): 1952, 1953, 1955, 1956, 1957, 1958, 1959, 1966, 1967, 1971, 1972, 1973, 1974, 1975, 1987, 1988, 1989, 1992, 1994, 2000, 2007, 2009, 2010, 2012, 2013, 2015, 2016
Istanbul Championship:
Winners (22):1926, 1927, 1928, 1929, 1930, 1931, 1932, 1933, 1934, 1935, 1936, 1937, 1941, 1942, 1943, 1944, 1945, 1946, 1947, 1948, 1949, 1950
Turkish Cup:
Winners  (9): 1987, 1988, 1989, 1992, 1993, 1994, 2004, 2010, 2013.

References

External links

Galatasaray SK Official Web Site 
Galatasaray Rowing Official Web Site  

Galatasaray Rowing
Rowing clubs in Turkey
Sport in Istanbul
1873 establishments in the Ottoman Empire